Yannick M'Bolo (born December 19, 1978 in Paris) is a French hip hop/chanson musician. He is best known for his internationally successful song "Ces soirées-là" (English: "Those Nights"), a 2000 dance-based re-imaging of the Four Seasons' hit pop song "December, 1963 (Oh, What a Night)".

References

External links
  

Living people
1978 births